The Kiambere Hydroelectric Power Station is an earth-filled embankment dam on the Tana River near Kiambere, Kenya. It straddles the border of Embu and Kitui Counties in the former Eastern Province. The primary purpose of the dam is hydroelectric power generation and it supports a 165 MW power station. Construction on the dam began in 1983 and it was completed in 1987. The power station was commissioned in 1988. Beginning in 2008 both turbine-generators were upgraded from 72 MW to 82.5 MW. They were commissioned in 2009. US$95 million in funding for the original project was provided by the World Bank. The power station is operated by Kenya Electricity Generating Company and is part of the Seven Forks Scheme.

Water from an intake on the saddle dam travels through a  headrace tunnel to the power station which is located underground. It contains two 82.5 MW Francis turbine-generators.

See also

 Kindaruma Dam – upstream
 List of power stations in Kenya

References

Energy infrastructure completed in 1988
Hydroelectric power stations in Kenya
Dams on the Tana River (Kenya)
Dams in Kenya
Dams completed in 1988
Underground power stations
Kitui County
Embu County